The Yugoslav Navy, was the navy of Yugoslavia from 1945 to 1992. It was essentially a coastal defense force with the mission of preventing enemy landings along Yugoslavia's rugged 4,000-kilometer shoreline or coastal islands, and contesting an enemy blockade or control of the strategic Strait of Otranto.

In 1990 it had 10,000 sailors (including 4,400 conscripts), including 2,300 in 25 coastal artillery batteries and 900 marines in one light naval infantry brigade. Following the breakup of Yugoslavia, the navy's equipment and watercraft were claimed by emergent Croatian Navy, Montenegrin Navy, Serbian River Flotilla, and Slovenian Navy.

History

The Partisans had operated many small boats in raids harassing Italian convoys in the Adriatic Sea during World War II. After the war, the navy operated numerous German and Italian submarines, destroyers, minesweepers, and tank-landing craft captured during the war or received as war reparations. The United States provided eight torpedo boats in the late 1940s, but most of those units were soon obsolete. Two ex-Royal Navy W-class destroyers were bought in 1956.

The navy was upgraded in the 1960s when it acquired ten Osa-I class missile boats and four Shershen-class torpedo boats from the Soviet Union. The Soviets granted a license to build eleven additional Shershen units in Yugoslav shipyards developed for this purpose.

In 1980 and 1982, the navy took delivery of two Soviet Koni-class frigates. In 1988 it completed two additional units under license. The Koni frigates were armed with four Soviet SS-N-2B surface-to-surface missile launchers, twin SA-N-4 surface-to-air missiles, and antisubmarine rocket launchers. The Yugoslav navy developed its own submarine-building capability during the 1960s. In 1990 the main combat units of the submarine service were three Heroj class patrol submarines armed with 533 mm torpedoes. Two smaller Sava class units entered service in the late 1970s. Two Sutjeska class submarines had been relegated mainly to training missions by 1990. At that time the navy had apparently shifted to construction of versatile midget submarines. Four Una-class midget submarines and four Mala-class swimmer delivery vehicles were in service in the late 1980s. They were built for use by underwater demolition teams and special forces. The Una-class boats carried five crewmen, eight combat swimmers, four Mala vehicles, and limpet mines. The Mala vehicles in turn carried two swimmers and 250 kilograms of mines.

The navy operated ten Osa I-class and six Rade Končar-class missile boats. The Osa I boats were armed with four SS-N-2A surface-to-surface missile launchers. In 1990 domestic Kobra boats were scheduled to begin replacing the Osa I boats. The Kobra was to be armed with four SS-N-2C launchers or eight Swedish RBS-15 antiship missile launchers. Armed with two SS-N-2B launchers, the Končar-class boats were modeled after the Swedish Spica class. The navy also operated fifteen Shershen-class torpedo boats and eleven Yugoslav-built units.

Patrol boats were operated primarily for antisubmarine warfare. The inventory included three Mornar-class corvettes with antisubmarine rocket launchers and depth charges. The Mornar class was based on a French design from the mid-1950s. Seventeen Mirna inshore patrol boats and thirteen older Kraljevica submarine chasers also were available.

The navy's mine warfare and countermeasures capabilities were considered adequate in 1990. It operated four Vukov Klanac class coastal minehunters built on a French design, four British  inshore minesweepers, and six 117-class inshore minesweepers built in domestic shipyards. Larger numbers of older and less capable minesweepers were mainly used in riverine operations. Other older units were used as dedicated minelayers. The navy used amphibious landing craft in support of army operations in the area of the Danube, Sava, and Drava rivers. They included both tank and assault landing craft. In 1990 there were four 501-class, ten 211-class, and twenty-five 601-class landing craft in service. Most of them were also capable of laying mines in rivers and coastal areas.

The coastal artillery batteries had both surface-to-surface missiles and guns. They operated the Soviet-designed SS-C-3 and a truck-mounted, Yugoslav-produced Brom antiship missile. The latter was essentially a Yugoslav variant of the Soviet SS-N-2. Coastal guns included over 400 88 mm, 122 mm, 130 mm, and 152 mm artillery pieces obtained from the Soviet Union, the United States, postwar Germany, and Yugoslav manufacturers.

Organisation

Navy
Minor surface combatants operated by the navy included nearly 80 frigates, corvettes, submarines, minesweepers, and missile, torpedo, and patrol boats in the Adriatic Fleet. The entire coast of Yugoslavia was part of the naval region headquartered at Split. The naval region was divided into three smaller naval districts and the Danube Flotilla with major bases located at Split, Šibenik, Pula, Ploče, and Kotor on the Adriatic and Novi Sad on the Danube. The fleet was organized into missile, torpedo, and patrol boat brigades, a submarine division, and minesweeper flotillas. The naval order of battle included four frigates, three corvettes, five patrol submarines, 58 missile, torpedo, and patrol boats, and 28 minesweepers. Navy had a support of one antisubmarine warfare helicopter squadron based at Divulje on the Adriatic for coastal operations. It employed Soviet Ka-25, Ka-28 and Mi-14 helicopters, and domestic Partisan helicopters. Some air force fighter and reconnaissance squadrons supported naval operations.

After the collapse of the State Union of Serbia and Montenegro (the final dissolution of Yugoslavia) the 108-th missile brigade for coastal defense, the 88-th fleet of submarines, the hydrographic Institute of the navy in Lepetani and the naval testing center were disbanded in 2007. Seven missile systems Frontier-E from the 108-th missile brigade and five missile boats class Osa were sold to Egypt, property of the naval testing center were transferred in the technical testing center of the Serbian army, naval base in Tivat Arsenal was sold to Canadian businessman Peter Munk for 3.2 million euro.

Marines
The 12th Naval Infantry Brigade (Mornarička Pešadijska Brigada) were the marines of the Yugoslav Navy until 4 February 2003 when it became part the Navy of the State Union of Serbia and Montenegro. The 12th Naval Infantry Brigade was headquartered in the 8th Naval Sector at Split but was later moved near Kotor, a coastal town in Montenegro. A small detachment was located at Novi Sad on the Danube. The brigade consisted of 900 to 2000 men in two or three battalions. As a multi-ethnic unit, the brigade was broken up during the Breakup of Yugoslavia, and it saw little action. The largest remnant eventually moved to Montenegro. There is a naval special forces detachment (Pomorski odred - Specijalne snage) In the Montenegrin Navy — perhaps this is composed of residual members of the 12th Naval Infantry Brigade.

Equipment

Sea Fleet

Frigates:

  
RF-31 Split (since 1993 Beograd) – Was withdrawn from operational use by VCSG. Later, was scrapped in August 2013.
RF-32 Koper (since 1993 Podgorica) – Was withdrawn from operational use by the Yugoslav Navy (RMVJ) in 1995. Partially cannibalised in 2007 and sold to Yugoimport SDPR for further cannibalisation. Later, was finally scrapped in his remnants in 2008 at Tivat Arsenal.
  
RF-33 Kotor – Remained in operational use by Navy of Serbia and Montenegro and after its dissolution by Montenegrin Navy. Withdrawn from service in 2019, to be sold. 
RF-34 Pula – Remained in operational use by Navy of Serbia and Montenegro and after its dissolution by Montenegrin Navy. Withdrawn from service in 2019, to be sold. 

Submarines: 

P-801 Tara - Formerly called Nebojša, the only Yugoslav Royal Navy submarine that survived the 1941 German invasion. Withdrawn from service in 1954. 
P-802 Sava - Withdrawn from service in 1968. 
P-901 Mališan - Former Italian midget submarine CB-20. Withdrawn from service in 1959. 
  
P-811 Sutjeska - Withdrawn from service in 1980.
P-812 Neretva - Withdrawn from service in 1981.
  
P-821 Heroj – Heavy maintenance stopped during 2004, withdrawn from operational use. Transformed into a showpiece Naval Museum in Tivat.
P-822 Junak – Withdrawn from operational use by the RMVJ mid-90s. Scrapped for reclaimed iron at Tivat Arsenal.
P-823 Uskok – Withdrawn from operational use by the RMVJ in 1998. Sold and scrapped for reclaimed iron to Izmir, Turkey, in 2007.
  
P-831 Sava – Withdrawn from operational use by VSCG in 2004. Towed to Turkey in March 2010, where she was cut for scrap.
P-832 Drava – Heavy maintenance stopped during 1996, withdrawn from operational use by the VSCG. Cut for scrap metal at Tivat Arsenal in June 2008.
  
P-911Tisa – Withdrawn from operational use by the RMVJ in 1997. To be on display in Belgrade
P-912 Una – Withdrawn from operational use by the RMVJ in 1997. Transformed into a showpiece Naval Museum in Tivat.
P-913 Zeta – On display at Pivka Military History Park in Pivka since 2011
P-914 Soča – Remained in Croatia during events of 1991. Heavy maintenance and modernization completed in 1996. In operational use by the Croatian Navy as  until 2004, when she was withdrawn. Currently awaiting sale at Lora Naval Base in Split, Croatia.
P-915 Vardar – Heavy maintenance stopped in 2003, withdrawn from operational use by the MVSCG. Cut into scrap metal in July 2008 at Tivat Arsenal.
P-916 Vrbas – Withdrawn from operational use by MVSCG in 2005. To be on display in Kumbor, Herceg-Novi.

Guided Missile Gunboats: 

  
RTOP-401 Rade Končar – Withdrawn from operational use by the MCG in 2006. Currently awaiting sale at Bar, Montenegro.
RTOP-402 Vlado Ćetković – Captured by the Croatian Navy at Šibenik in 1991. Introduced into operational use as RTOP-21 Šibenik. Located at Lora Naval Base in Split.
RTOP-403 Ramiz Sadiku – Heavy maintenance stopped mid-1990s. Withdrawn from operational use by the RMVJ in 2007. Scrapped in 2014.
RTOP-404 Hasan Zahirović-Laca – Withdrawn from operational use by the MCG in 2006. Currently awaiting sale at Bar, Montenegro.
RTOP-405 Jordan Nikolov – Orce – Overhauled and in storage by the MCG.
RTOP-406 Ante Banina – Overhauled and in storage by the MCG.

Fast Missile Boats: 
  
RČ-301 Mitar Acev– Captured by the Croatian Navy at Šibenik in 1991. In operational use by the Croatian Navy as the fast patrol boat-minelayer OBM-41 Dubrovnik until 2008.
RČ-302 Vlado Bagat – Withdrawn from operational use by the RMVJ in the mid-1990s. Fate unknown.
RČ-303 Petar Drapšin - Withdrawn from operational use by the RMVJ in the mid-1990s. Fate unknown.
RČ-304 Stjepan Filipović-Stevo – Withdrawn from operational use by the RMVJ in the mid-1990s. Modernised at Tivat Arsenal in Montenegro. In operational use by Egyptian Navy since 2007, serial 647.
RČ-305 Žikica Jovanović-Španac - Withdrawn from operational use by the RMVJ in the mid-1990s. Modernised at Tivat Arsenal in Montenegro. In operational use by Egyptian Navy since 2007, serial 649.
RČ-306 Nikola Martinović - Withdrawn from operational use by the RMVJ in the mid-1990s. Modernised at Tivat Arsenal in Montenegro. In operational use by Egyptian Navy since 2007, serial 651.
RČ-307 Josip Mažar –Šoša - Withdrawn from operational use by the RMVJ in the mid-1990s. Modernised at Tivat Arsenal in Montenegro. In operational use by Egyptian Navy since 2007, serial 653.
RČ-308 Karlo Rojc - Withdrawn from operational use by the RMVJ in the mid-1990s. Modernised at Tivat Arsenal in Montenegro. In operational use by the Egyptian Navy since 2007, serial 655.
RČ-309 Franc Rozman-Stane - Withdrawn from operational use by the RMVJ in the mid-1990s. Fate unknown.
RČ-310 Velimir Škorpik – Captured in September 1991 at Šibenik by the Croatian Navy and sunk on 12 October 1994 as live ammunition target practice by the missile boats Kralj Petar Krešimir IV and OBM-41 Dubrovnik during operation Posejdon.
Torpedo boats:
  /
TČ-211 Pionir
TČ-212 Partizan
TČ-213 Proleter
TČ-214 Topčider
TČ-215 Ivan
TČ-216 Jadran
TČ-217 Kornat
TČ-218 Biokovac
TČ-219 Streljko - Captured by the Croatian Navy in September 1991 at Šibenik . Heavily damaged, she never returned to service and was sunk as a target by the missile boats Kralj Petar Krešimir IV and OBM-41 Dubrovnik on 12 October 1994, during operation Posejdon.
TČ-220 Crvena zvezda
TČ-221 Partizan III - Captured in September 1991 at Šibenik by the Croatian Navy, with which she saw service as OBM-51 Vukovar.
TČ-222 Partizan II
TČ-223 Napredak
TČ-224 Pionir II

Patrol boats:
C-80 class 
PČ-132 Kalnik
PČ-133 Velebit
PČ-134 Romanija
PČ-135 Triglav
PČ-136 Lovćen
  
PČ-171 Biokovo - Damaged off Škarda island by a 9K11 Malyutka missile fired by Croatian naval personnel landed from the armed fishing boats Maša and Nirvana, anchored at a cove in the island on 10 November 1991; limped to Mali Lošinj. Later captured by the Croatian Navy. In operational use as OB-01 Novigrad. Located at Lora Naval Base in Split.
PČ-172 Pohorje - In Montenegro, used for tourists.
PČ-173 Koprivnik - In Montenegro, used for tourists.
PČ-174 Učka - In service with Montenegro police
PČ-175 Grmeč - Evacuated to Montenegro during 1991. Sold to a private owner from Croatia in 2007.
PČ-176 Mukos - Heavily damaged on 14 November 1991 off Šolta island by a torpedo launched by Croatian Navy special forces during the Battle of the Dalmatian channels. Abandoned by the JRM and towed by local civilian boats, she was later raised, repaired and put back in operational use by HRM as OB-02 Šolta.
PČ-177 Fruška gora - In Montenegro, used for tourists.
PČ-178 Kosmaj - In service with Montenegro police
PČ-179 Zelengora - Evacuated to Montenegro during 1991. In 2007, she was sold to a private owner from Croatia.
PČ-180 Cer - Captured by the Croatian Navy at Šibenik in 1991. In operational use as OB-03 Cavtat. Located at Lora Naval Base in Split, Croatia.
PČ-181 Durmitor - Captured by the Croatian Navy at Šibenik in 1991. In operational use as OB-04 Hrvatska Kostajnica. Located at Lora Naval Base in Split, Croatia.

School ship:

 Galeb  / 
 Jadran  - Currently in operational use by Montenegro.

River Fleet
Command ship
RPB-30 Kozara 

Station for degauss
36 Šabac 

River minesweepers
 Neštin class 
 RML-331 Neštin - In service with the River Flotilla of the Serbian Armed Forces.
 RML-332 Motajica - In service with the River Flotilla of the Serbian Armed Forces.
 RML-333 Belegiš - sold to a tourist agency.
 RML-334 Bosut - Withdrawn and cannibalised.
 RML-335 Vučedol - In service with the River Flotilla of the Serbian Armed Forces.
 RML-336 Djerdap - In service with the River Flotilla of the Serbian Armed Forces.
307 class
RML-307
RML-308 - Damaged in combat in the Danube on 8 November 1991 while attempting to stop Czechoslovak towboat Šariš, suspected of smuggling arms to Croatia.
RML-309
RML-310

River patrol boats
21 class 
ČMP-21
ČMP-22
ČMP-23
ČMP-24
25 class 
ČMP-25
ČMP-26
ČMP-27
302 class 
PČ-302
PČ-303

Assault boats
101 class 
DČ-101 
DČ-102

See also
 Royal Yugoslav Navy
 Croatian Navy
 Navy of the Independent State of Croatia
 Slovenian Navy
 Serbian River Flotilla
 Military of Serbia and Montenegro

Notes

References

 Željko Komnenović. Potop mornarice Crne Gore
 
 Yugoslavia's Sabotage Submarines

 
 
Yugoslav Navy
Military units and formations disestablished in 1991